Fall is an 2022 Indian-Tamil-language thriller drama streaming television series, which is an official remake of the Canadian series Vertige. The series was directed by Siddharth Ramaswamy for Disney+ Hotstar under the banner of Banijay Asia and Circle Box Entertainment.

The principal characters of the series include Anjali, Santhosh Prathap, Sastika Rajendran, Poornima Bhagyaraj, Namita Krishnamurthy, Sonia Agarwal and S. P. Charan. The series is about, a young women who has been in a coma since falling off the roof of the family business three months earlier. Fall premiered on 9 December 2022, and consists of seven episodes.

Episodes ==

Cast
 Anjali as Dhivya
 Santhosh Prathap as Daniel
 Sastika Rajendran
 Poornima Bhagyaraj as Dhivya's Mother
 Namita Krishnamurthy as Maya
 S. P. Charan as Rohit Selvakumar
 Sonia Agarwal as Malar
 Thalaivasal Vijay as Dhivya's Father 
 Raj Mohan as Thirukumaran
 Yohan (Debut) as Jeeva

Development

Release
It was announced on Saturday 16 September 2022 that the series will be released in Tamil and dubbed in Telugu, Hindi, Malayalam, Kannada, Marathi and Bengali will make its streaming debut on December 9, on Disney+ Hotstar. And was also released the first look poster.

References 

Tamil-language Disney+ Hotstar original programming
Tamil-language web series
2022 Tamil-language television series debuts
Tamil-language thriller television series
Tamil-language crime television series
Tamil-language television series based on non-Tamil-language television series